Sefid Kamar (also Romanized as Sefīd Kamar and Safīd Kamar) is a village in Ijrud-e Pain Rural District, Halab District, Ijrud County, Zanjan Province, Iran. At the 2006 census, its population was 206, in 67 families.

References 

Populated places in Ijrud County